, also known as , was the 111th emperor of Japan, according to the traditional order of succession.

Go-Sai's reign spanned the years from 1655 through 1663.

This 17th-century sovereign was named after the 9th-century Emperor Junna and go- (後), translates as later, and thus, he could have been called the "Later Emperor Junna". Emperor Go-Sai could not pass the throne onto his descendants.  For this reason, he was known as the Go-Saiin emperor, after an alternate name of Emperor Junna, who had confronted and reached an accommodation with similar issues.  This emperor was also called  .  The Japanese word go has also been translated to mean the second one, and thus, this emperor might be identified as "Junna II". During the Meiji era, the name became just Go-Sai.

Genealogy

He was the eighth son of Emperor Go-Mizunoo. He was raised as if he were the son of Tōfuku-mon'in; both former Empress Meishō and former Emperor Go-Kōmyō were his older half-siblings.

Emperor Go-Sai's Imperial family lived with him in the Dairi of the Heian Palace. This family included at least 16 sons and 17 daughters, none of whom would ascend to the throne.

Nyōgo: Princess Akiko (明子女王; 1638–1680) later Myokichijou’in (妙吉祥院), Imperial Prince Takamatsu-no-miya Yoshihito's daughter
First daughter: Imperial Princess Tomoko (1654–1686; 誠子内親王)
First son: Imperial Prince Hachijō-no-miya Osahito (1655–1675; 八条宮長仁親王) – fourth Hachijō-no-miya, Hachijō-no-miya Yasuhito's adopted son
Lady-in-waiting: Seikanji Tomoko (d.1695; 清閑寺共子), Seikanji Tomotsuna's daughter
Second son: Imperial Prince Arisugawa-no-miya Yukihito (1656–1695; 有栖川宮幸仁親王) – 3rd Arisugawa-no-miya
Second daughter: Second Princess (Onna-Ni-no-miya, 1657–1658; 女二宮)
Third daughter: Princess Sōei (1658–1721; 宗栄女王)
Fourth daughter: Princess Sonsyū (1661–1722; 尊秀女王)
Fourth son: Imperial Prince Priest Gien (1662–1706; 義延法親王)
Sixth daughter: Princess Enkōin (1663; 円光院宮)
Fifth son: Imperial Prince Priest Tenshin (1664–1690; 天真法親王)
Seventh daughter: Princess Kaya (1666–1675; 賀陽宮)
Tenth daughter: Imperial Princess Mashiko (1669–1738; 益子内親王) married Kujo Sukezane
Eleventh daughter: Princess Rihō (1672–1745; 理豊女王)
Thirteenth daughter: Princess Zuikō (1674–1706; 瑞光女王)
Consort: Iwakura Tomoki's Daughter
Third son: Imperial Prince Priest Eigo (1659–1676; 永悟法親王)
Consort: Ukyō-no-Tsubone (右京局), Tominokōji Yorinao's Daughter
Fifth daughter: Princess Tsune (1661–1665; 常宮)
Consort: Umenokōji Sadako (梅小路定子), Umenokōji Sadanori's adopted daughter and Kōgenji Tomohide's daughter
Eighth daughter: Princess Kaku (1667–1668; 香久宮)
Ninth daughter: Princess Syō'an (1668–1712; 聖安女王)
Sixth son: Imperial Prince Priest Kōben (1669–1716; 公弁法親王)
Seventh son: Imperial Prince Priest Dōyū (1670–1691; 道祐法親王)
Eighth son: Imperial Prince Hachijō-no-miya Naohito (1671–1689; 八条宮尚仁親王) – fifth Hachijō-no-miya
Twelfth daughter: Princess Mitsu (1672–1677; 満宮)
Fourteenth daughter: Princess Sonkō (1675–1719; 尊杲女王)
Fifteenth daughter: Princess Sonsyō (1676–1703; 尊勝女王)
Eleventh son: Imperial Prince Priest Ryō'ou (1678–1708; 良応法親王)
Sixteenth daughter: Ryougetsuin (1679; 涼月院) (there is still doubt about birth mother)
Consort: Azechi-no-tsubone (按察使局, Takatsuji Toyonaga's Daughter
Ninth son: Imperial Prince Priest Sondō (道尊法親王) (1676–1705; Buddhist Priest)
Consort: Matsuki Atsuko (松木条子), Matsuki Muneatsu's Daughter
Tenth son: Prince Roei’in (槿栄院宮; 1677)
Sixteenth son: Imperial prince Satohito, later Emperor Reigen

Events of Go-Sai's life
Nagahito-shinnō became emperor when his emperor-brother died.  This death left the throne vacant and the succession (senso) was received by the new monarch. Shortly thereafter, Emperor Go-Sai is considered to have acceded to the throne (sokui). The events during his lifetime shed light on his reign. The years of Go-Sai's reign correspond  with a period in which Tokugawa Ietsuna was the leader at the pinnacle of the Tokugawa shogunate.

Go-Sai married the daughter of the first ; and he succeeded as second Takamatsu-no-miya. Then this Imperial prince became the emperor as a temporary measure until his younger brother,  could grow older.

 January 1, 1638: The birth of an Imperial prince who will become known by the posthumous name of  Go-Sai-tennō.
 January 5, 1655: The death of Go-Kōmyō caused the succession (senso) to be passed to his brother; and when the succession (senso) was received, the reign of Emperor Go-Sai was deemed to commence.
 1655 (Meireki 1): The new ambassador of Korea, arrived in Japan.
 March 2–3, 1657 (Meireki 3, 18–19th days of the 1st month): Great Fire of Meireki: The city of Edo was devastated by a violent fire.
 1659 (Manji 5): In Edo, construction begins on the Ryōgoku Bridge (ryōgokubashi).
 1661 (Manji 6): Imperial Palace in Kyoto is burnt to the ground; and the Gekū at Yamada was seriously damaged by fire.
 March 20, 1662 (Kanbun 2, 1st day of the 2nd month):  There was a violent earthquake in Kyoto which destroyed the tomb of the Taiko, Toyotomi Hideyoshi.
 1662 (Kanbun 2): Emperor Gosai ordered Tosa Hiromichi 土佐広通 (1561–1633), a Tosa-school disciple, to adopt the name Sumiyoshi (probably in reference to a 13th-century painter,  Sumiyoshi Keinin 住吉慶忍), upon assuming a position as official painter for the Sumiyoshi Taisha 住吉大社).
 March 5, 1663 (Kanbun 3, 26th day of the 1st month): Emperor Go-Sai abdicated, which meant that the Prince Satohito received the succession (senso).  Shortly thereafter, Emperor Reigen formally acceded to the throne (sokui).

After abdicating, Go-sai put his heart into scholarship and he left behind many books, including the "Water and Sun Collection" (Suinichishū, 水日集).  He was talented in waka; and he had a profound understanding of the classics.

During his reign, because of great fires at the Grand Ise Shrine, Osaka Castle, and the Imperial Palace, among others, the Great Meireki Fire, earthquakes in the region, and because of repeated floods, many people blamed the Emperor, saying he lacked moral virtue.

 March 26, 1685 (Jōkyō 2, 22nd day of the 2nd month): Former-Emperor Go-Sai died; and a great comet was observed crossing the night sky.

Emperor Go-Sai is enshrined in the imperial mausoleum, Tsuki no wa no misasagi, at Sennyū-ji in Higashiyama-ku, Kyoto.  Also enshrined are Go-Sai's immediate predecessors, Emperor Go-Mizunoo, Empress Meishō and Go-Kōmyō. Go-Sai's immediate Imperial successors, including Reigen, Higashiyama, Nakamikado, Sakuramachi, Momozono, Go-Sakuramachi and Go-Momozono, are enshrined here as well.

At the Kitano Shrine, a tablet over the Chu-mon entryway reads tenmangu in the calligraphy of Emperor Go-sai.

Kugyō
 is a collective term for the very few most powerful men attached to the court of the Emperor of Japan in pre-Meiji eras. Even during those years in which the court's actual influence outside the palace walls was minimal, the hierarchic organization persisted.

In general, this elite group included only three to four men at a time.  These were hereditary courtiers whose experience and background would have brought them to the pinnacle of a life's career.  During Go-Sai's reign, this apex of the Daijō-kan included:
 Kampaku, Nijō Mitsuhira, 1653–1663
 Sadaijin
 Udaijin
 Naidaijin
 Dainagon

Eras of Go-Sai-tennō's reign
The years of Go-Sai's reign are more specifically identified by more than one era name or nengō.
 Jōō     (1652–1655)
 Meireki               (1655–1658)
 Manji                 (1658–1661)
 Kanbun  (1661–1673)

Ancestry

See also
 Emperor of Japan
 List of Emperors of Japan
 Imperial cult

References

 Martin, John H. and Phyllis G. Martin. (2002).   Kyoto: A Cultural Guide to Japan's Ancient Imperial City. Tokyo:Tuttle Publishing. ;   OCLC 243831939
 Meyer, Eva-Maria. (1999).  Japans Kaiserhof in der Edo-Zeit: unter besonderer Berücksichtigung der Jahre 1846 bis 1867.  Münster: LIT Verlag. ;   OCLC 42041594
 Ponsonby-Fane, Richard Arthur Brabazon. (1959).  The Imperial House of Japan. Kyoto: Ponsonby Memorial Society. OCLC 194887
 Titsingh, Isaac. (1834). Nihon Ōdai Ichiran; ou,  Annales des empereurs du Japon.  Paris: Royal Asiatic Society, Oriental Translation Fund of Great Britain and Ireland.  OCLC 5850691
 Varley, H. Paul. (1980). Jinnō Shōtōki: A Chronicle of Gods and Sovereigns. New York: Columbia University Press. ;  OCLC 59145842

External links
 National Museum of Japanese History – see example of Emperor Go-sai's calligraphy

Japanese emperors
1638 births
1685 deaths
Emperor Go-Sai
Emperor Go-Sai
Emperor Go-Sai
17th-century Japanese monarchs